Moinidae is a crustacean family within the order Cladocera. Species within this family are widely occurring, including North America and Africa. In newer classifications, it is sometimes included in the family Daphniidae.

Genera
These two genera belong to the family Moinidae:
 Moina Baird, 1850
 Moinodaphnia Herrick, 1887

References

Cladocera
Crustacean families